Neoptista is a genus of moths of the family Erebidae. The genus was described by Schaus in 1916.

The Global Lepidoptera Names Index gives this name as a synonym of Lepteria Schaus, 1913.

Species
Neoptista lorna (Schaus, 1904) Brazil
Neoptista villalis Schaus, 1916 Mexico

References

Herminiinae